Novoilyinskoye is a rural locality (a selo) and the administrative center of Palnikovskoye Rural Settlement, Permsky District, Perm Krai, Russia. The population was 108 as of 2010. There are 10 streets.

Geography 
Novoilyinskoye is located 60 km southwest of Perm (the district's administrative centre) by road. Verkh-Rechka is the nearest rural locality.

References 

Rural localities in Permsky District